The men's freestyle light heavyweight was a Catch as Catch Can wrestling, later freestyle, held as part of the Wrestling at the 1920 Summer Olympics programme. It was the first appearance of the weight class. Light heavyweight was the second-heaviest category, and included wrestlers weighing up to 80 kilograms.

A total of 13 wrestlers from eight nations competed in the event, which was held from Wednesday, August 25 to Friday, August 27, 1920.

Results

References

External links
 
 
 

Wrestling at the 1920 Summer Olympics